Amoonguna is a community in Rodinga Ward of the MacDonnell Region in the Northern Territory of Australia,  southeast of Alice Springs.

The community features in the 2022 SBS Television police drama miniseries, True Colours.

References

External links
Amoonguna webpage on the MacDonnell Regional Council website

Towns in the Northern Territory